Jay Choi (born September 30, 1983) is an American professional golfer.

Choi was born in Kunsan, South Korea. He graduated from Gahr High School in Cerritos, California and played college golf at the University of New Mexico.

Choi played the mini-tours in the U.S. for several years. He has played on the Japan Golf Tour since 2010, and won his first title on the tour in May 2012 at the Totoumi Hamamatsu Open. He has ranked in the top-200 in the Official World Golf Ranking.

Professional wins (1)

Japan Golf Tour wins (1)

References

External links

New Mexico Lobos profile

American male golfers
New Mexico Lobos men's golfers
Japan Golf Tour golfers
Golfers from California
1983 births
Living people